Wasson is an unincorporated community in East Eldorado and Raleigh Townships, Saline County, Illinois, United States.

Wasson started as a company village for the Wasson Coal Company outside of Harrisburg, Illinois. The village was named after C.M. Wasson and his son. Mr. Wasson began his career as a junk dealer and eventually became one of the leading coal mining and banking pioneers in Southern Illinois.

References

Unincorporated communities in Saline County, Illinois
Unincorporated communities in Illinois
Company towns in Illinois